, abbreviated as  is a Japanese light novel series written by SunSunSun and illustrated by Momoco. It was originally published online as two short stories on the novel publishing website Shōsetsuka ni Narō from May 6 to May 27, 2020, respectively. It was then acquired by Kadokawa Shoten, who have published five volumes and a short story volume since February 2021 under their Kadokawa Sneaker Bunko imprint. A manga adaptation by Saho Tenamachi began serialization online in Kodansha's Magazine Pocket website and app in October 2022. An anime television series adaptation has been announced.

Synopsis 
Alisa Mikhailovna Kujo, who attends a private school, Seirei Gakuen, is a high school girl with silver hair who looks so beautiful that anyone can turn around if she walks. The main character, Masachika Kuze, who sits next to Alisa, is an unmotivated student who just sleeps at school, and she always complains. For some reason, such Alisa sometimes speaks in Russian. However, Alisa did not know that Masachika could understand Russian as well in the native level.

Characters 

Masachika is the main male protagonist of the series, has held the position envied by many boys, the seat next to Alisa, Masachika understood Russian because of his paternal grandfather, who was a great lover of Russia. He is a first-year student. In fact, he is Yuki's older brother.

Alisa is the main female protagonist of the series. She is very talented and popular girl. She is a first-year student. She is Maria's younger sister.

Yuki is a first-year who served as the student council public relation, and her name was Suo Yuki. She is the eldest daughter of the Suo house, whose origin was a former noble family and has shouldered the role of a diplomat for generations. She is a genuine young lady. In fact, she is Masachika's younger sister.

Maria is a second-year and the student council secretary. She is Arisa's older sister.

Media

Web novel 
Before the light novel's publication, two short stories were published on Shōsetsuka ni Narō on May 6 and May 27, 2020. However, the stories and characters in the web version are completely different from the published novel.

Light novel 
The light novel series is written by SunSunSun and illustrated by Momoco. In June 2020, SunSunSun first received an invitation from Kadokawa Sneaker Bunko for whether the imprint could publish the work. On December 22, 2020, it was announced the short stories published on Shōsetsuka ni Narō will be published by Kadokawa Shoten under their Kadokawa Sneaker Bunko imprint after being adapted as a series. The title of the series follows the title of one of the two short stories. The first volume was published on February 27, 2021. 

At Sakura-Con 2022, Yen Press announced that they licensed the series for English publication.

Manga 
A manga adaptation with art by Saho Tenamachi began serialization in Kodansha's Magazine Pocket website and app on October 29, 2022. The first tankōbon volume was released on March 9, 2023.

Anime
An anime television series adaptation was announced on March 17, 2023.

Other 
A VTuber model of Alya debuted in July 2021 to promote the release of the second light novel volume.

Reception 
Alya Sometimes Hides Her Feelings in Russian ranked ninth in the 2022 edition of Takarajimasha's annual light novel guide book Kono Light Novel ga Sugoi! in the bunkobon category, and fifth overall among the other new series of that year. It also ranked fifth in the bunkobon category of the 2023 edition. At the 2021 Next Light Novel Awards, the series placed first in the Librarian's Choice category. It also ranked second in the Web Publication category, and ninth in the overall category. As of April 2022, the series has 500,000 copies in circulation.

References

External links 
 at Shōsetsuka ni Narō 
 
 

Illustrator's Twitter Page

2021 Japanese novels
Anime and manga based on light novels
Japanese webcomics
Kadokawa Sneaker Bunko
Kodansha manga
Light novels
Light novels first published online
Romantic comedy anime and manga
School life in anime and manga
Shōsetsuka ni Narō
Shōnen manga
Upcoming anime television series
Webcomics in print
Yen Press titles